Aristippus of Larissa in Thessaly was one of the Aleuadae who received lessons from the philosopher Gorgias when he visited Thessaly.

Aristippus obtained money and troops from Cyrus the Younger to resist a faction opposed to him, and placed his lover, the general Meno, in command over these forces.

References

Ancient Larissaeans
5th-century BC Greek people